The 1997–98 Rhode Island Rams men's basketball team represented the University of Rhode Island in the 1997–98 college basketball season. This was head coach Jim Harrick's first of two seasons at Rhode Island. The Rams competed in the Atlantic 10 Conference and played their home games at Keaney Gymnasium. They finished the season 25–9, 12–4 in A-10 play and lost in the semifinals of the 1998 Atlantic 10 men's basketball tournament. They were invited to the 1998 NCAA tournament where they advanced to the Elite Eight before falling to Stanford in the Midwest Regional final.

As of the 2020–21 NCAA Division I men's basketball season, this is the furthest any Rhode Island men's team has ever advanced in the NCAA tournament.

Roster

Schedule and results

|-
!colspan=9 style=| Regular season

|-
!colspan=9 style=| Atlantic 10 tournament

|-
!colspan=9 style=| NCAA tournament

Rankings

*AP does not release post-NCAA Tournament rankings^Coaches did not release a week 2 poll

Awards and honors
Cuttino Mobley – Atlantic 10 Player of the Year
Tyson Wheeler – AP Honorable Mention All-American

1998 NBA draft

References

Rhode Island
Rhode Island
Rhode Island Rams men's basketball seasons
Rhode
Rhode